Oberhausen is a municipality in the Neuburg-Schrobenhausen district in the state of Bavaria in Germany.

Oberhausen combines historic Oberhausen, Unterhausen, Sinning and Kreut.

Neighboring communities include Rennertshofen, Burgheim, Ehekirchen, Rohrenfels, Königsmoos and Neuburg an der Donau.

Bahnhof Unterhausen is the local train station.

Population
The population as of January, 2005:

History
In 1214, Oberhausen and Unterhausen were documented.

There were heavy casualties and great damage to Oberhausen and Unterhausen during World War II. In the woods just outside Sinning, there are reinforced, concrete bunkers built during World War II that still exist today.

In 1972, Oberhausen, Unterhausen and Sinning were combined under the name Oberhausen.  In 1994, Kreut was added to the municipality.

The four communities
Oberhausen is made up of Oberhausen, Unterhausen, Sinning, Kreut.

Oberhausen

Oberhausen was first documented in 1214.

Unterhausen

Grumoldshausen or Grünwaldshausen oder Grimoldshausen, the original name of Unterhausen, was created in the 8th century.

Sinning

Sinning was first documented in 1176.

Kreut

Kreut joined the municipality in 1994.

References

External links

www.sisby.de — Municipal Facts

Neuburg-Schrobenhausen
Populated places on the Danube